is a railway station on Kintetsu Railway's Kyoto Line in Kyōtanabe, Kyoto, Japan.

Lines

Kintetsu Railway
Kyoto Line (Station number B18)

Layout
The station has two platforms serving two tracks. Both platforms are elevated.

Platforms

History
1928 - The station opens as a station of Nara Electric Railroad
1963 - NER merges and the station becomes part of Kintetsu
2007 - Starts using PiTaPa

Surrounding area
JR Miyamaki Station
It takes about 2 minutes from here on foot.

Adjacent stations

References

External links
Official Website

Railway stations in Kyoto Prefecture
Railway stations in Japan opened in 1928